The Guam Police Department is the law enforcement agency in the United States territory of Guam. The department has jurisdiction across the entire territory, except for areas covered by the port, airport and military bases; the Guam Police Department has authority over military dependents on base, since civilians cannot be charged under the Uniform Code of Military Justice.

The police department is headquartered in the Guam Police Department Building in the Tiyan area of Barrigada, and operates four precincts.

History
The Guam Police Department was created in 1949. Prior to this, law enforcement on Guam was handled by the U.S. Navy administered Guam Insular Guard and the civilian run Guam Insular Patrol Force.

Gallery

References

External links
http://gpd.guam.gov/
http://www.guampolice.com/index3.html
http://www.isiservicescorp.com/mjcpatch.html

State law enforcement agencies of the United States
Government of Guam
Government agencies established in 1949
1949 establishments in Guam
Barrigada, Guam